Aitzenbach is a small river of Hesse, Germany. It flows into the Usa near Ober-Mörlen.

See also
List of rivers of Hesse

Rivers of Hesse
Rivers of the Taunus
Rivers of Germany